Slavs are the largest European ethnolinguistic group. They speak the various Slavic languages, belonging to the larger Balto-Slavic branch of the Indo-European languages. Slavs are geographically distributed throughout northern Eurasia, mainly inhabiting Central, Eastern and Southeastern Europe. A large Slavic minority is also scattered across the Baltic states and Central Asia, while a substantial Slavic diaspora is found throughout the Americas, as a result of immigration.

Present-day Slavs are classified into East Slavs (chiefly Belarusians, Russians, Rusyns, and Ukrainians), West Slavs (chiefly Czechs, Kashubians, Poles, Slovaks and Sorbs) and South Slavs (chiefly Bosniaks, Bulgarians, Croats, Macedonians, Montenegrins, Serbs and Slovenes).

The vast majority of Slavs are traditionally Christians. However, modern Slavic nations and ethnic groups are considerably diverse both genetically and culturally, and relations between them – even within the individual groups – range from "ethnic solidarity to mutual feelings of hostility".

Ethnonym

The oldest documents written in Old Church Slavonic, dating from the 9th century, attest the autonym as Slověne.

The reconstructed autonym  is usually considered a derivation from slovo ("word"), originally denoting "people who speak (the same language)", meaning "people who understand one another", in contrast to the Slavic word denoting "German people", namely , meaning "silent, mute people" (from Slavic  "mute, mumbling").

In medieval and early modern sources written in Latin, Slavs are most commonly referred to as Sclaveni or the shortened version Sclavi.

History

Origins

First mentions

Ancient Roman sources refer to the Early Slavic peoples as Veneti, who dwelt in a region of central Europe east of the Germanic tribe of Suebi, and west of the Iranian Sarmatians in the 1st and 2nd centuries AD, between the upper Vistula and Dnieper rivers. The Slavs under name of the Antes and the Sclaveni first appear in Byzantine records in the early 6th century. Byzantine historiographers under emperor Justinian I (527–565), such as Procopius of Caesarea, Jordanes and Theophylact Simocatta describe tribes of these names emerging from the area of the Carpathian Mountains, the lower Danube and the Black Sea, invading the Danubian provinces of the Eastern Empire.

Jordanes, in his work Getica (written in 551 AD), describes the Veneti as a "populous nation" whose dwellings begin at the sources of the Vistula and occupy "a great expanse of land". He also describes the Veneti as the ancestors of Antes and Slaveni, two early Slavic tribes, who appeared on the Byzantine frontier in the early 6th century. Procopius wrote in 545 that "the Sclaveni and the Antae actually had a single name in the remote past; for they were both called Sporoi in olden times". The name Sporoi derives from Greek σπείρω ("I scatter grain"). He described them as barbarians, who lived under democracy, believed in one god, "the maker of lightning" (Perun), to whom they made a sacrifice. They lived in scattered housing and constantly changed settlement. In war, they were mainly foot soldiers with shields, spears, bows, and little armour, which was reserved mainly for chiefs and their inner circle of warriors. Their language is "barbarous" (that is, not Greek), and the two tribes are alike in appearance, being tall and robust, "while their bodies and hair are neither very fair or blond, nor indeed do they incline entirely to the dark type, but they are all slightly ruddy in color. And they live a hard life, giving no heed to bodily comforts..." Jordanes described the Sclaveni having swamps and forests for their cities. Another 6th-century source refers to them living among nearly-impenetrable forests, rivers, lakes, and marshes.

Menander Protector mentions a Daurentius (c. 577–579) who slew an Avar envoy of Khagan Bayan I for asking the Slavs to accept the suzerainty of the Avars; Daurentius declined and is reported as saying: "Others do not conquer our land, we conquer theirs – so it shall always be for us as long as there are wars and weapons".

Migrations

According to eastern homeland theory, prior to becoming known to the Roman world, Slavic-speaking tribes were part of the many multi-ethnic confederacies of Eurasia – such as the Sarmatian, Hun and Gothic empires. The Slavs emerged from obscurity when the westward movement of Germanic tribes in the 5th and 6th centuries CE (thought to be in conjunction with the movement of peoples from Siberia and Eastern Europe: Huns, and later Avars and Bulgars) started the great migration of the Slavs, who settled the lands abandoned by Germanic tribes fleeing the Huns and their allies: westward into the country between the Oder and the Elbe-Saale line; southward into Bohemia, Moravia, much of present-day Austria, the Pannonian plain and the Balkans; and northward along the upper Dnieper river. It has also been suggested that some Slavs migrated with the Vandals to the Iberian Peninsula and even North Africa.

Around the 6th century, Slavs appeared on Byzantine borders in great numbers. Byzantine records note that Slav numbers were so great, that grass would not regrow where the Slavs had marched through. After a military movement even the Peloponnese and Asia Minor were reported to have Slavic settlements. This southern movement has traditionally been seen as an invasive expansion. By the end of the 6th century, Slavs had settled the Eastern Alps regions.

Pope Gregory I in 600 CE wrote to Maximus, the bishop of Salona (in Dalmatia), in which he expresses concern about the arrival of the Slavs: "Et quidem de Sclavorum gente, quae vobis valde imminet, et affligor vehementer et conturbor. Affligor in his quae jam in vobis patior; conturbor, quia per Istriae aditum jam ad Italiam intrare coeperunt." ("I am both distressed and disturbed about the Slavs, who are pressing hard on you. I am distressed because I sympathize with you; I am disturbed because they have already begun to arrive in Italy through the entry-point of Istria.")

Middle Ages

When Slav migrations ended, their first state organizations appeared, each headed by a prince with a treasury and a defense force. In the 7th century, the Frankish merchant Samo supported the Slavs against their Avar rulers and became the ruler of the first known Slav state in Central Europe, Samo's Empire. This early Slavic polity probably did not outlive its founder and ruler, but it was the foundation for later West Slavic states on its territory. The oldest of them was Carantania; others are the Principality of Nitra, the Moravian principality (see under Great Moravia) and the Balaton Principality. The First Bulgarian Empire was founded in 681 as an alliance between the ruling Bulgars and the numerous Slavs in the area, and their South Slavic language, the Old Church Slavonic, became the main and official language of the empire in 864. Bulgaria was instrumental in the spread of Slavic literacy and Christianity to the rest of the Slavic world. The expansion of the Magyars into the Carpathian Basin and the Germanization of Austria gradually separated the South Slavs from the West and East Slavs. Later Slavic states, which formed in the following centuries, included the Kievan Rus', the Second Bulgarian Empire, the Kingdom of Poland, Duchy of Bohemia, the Kingdom of Croatia, Banate of Bosnia and the Serbian Empire.

Modern era

Pan-Slavism, a movement which came into prominence in the mid-19th century, emphasized the common heritage and unity of all the Slavic peoples. The main focus was in the Balkans where the South Slavs had been ruled for centuries by other empires: the Byzantine Empire, Austria-Hungary, the Ottoman Empire, and Venice. Austro-Hungary envisioned its own political concept of Austro-Slavism, in opposition of Pan-Slavism that was predominantly led by the Russian Empire.

As of 1878, there were only three majority Slavic states in the world: the Russian Empire, Principality of Serbia and Principality of Montenegro. Bulgaria was effectively independent but was de jure vassal to the Ottoman Empire until official independence was declared in 1908. The Slavic peoples who were, for the most part, denied a voice in the affairs of the Austro-Hungarian Empire, were calling for national self-determination. During World War I, representatives of the Czechs, Slovaks, Poles, Serbs, Croats, and Slovenes set up organizations in the Allied countries to gain sympathy and recognition. In 1918, after World War I ended, the Slavs established such independent states as Czechoslovakia, the Second Polish Republic, and the Kingdom of Serbs, Croats and Slovenes.

One of Hitler's ambitions at the start of World War II was to exterminate, expel, or enslave most or all East and West Slavs from their native lands, so as to make living space for German settlers. This plan of genocide was to be carried into effect gradually over 25 to 30 years. The first half of the 20th century in Russia and the Soviet Union was marked by a succession of wars, famines and other disasters, each accompanied by large-scale population losses. Stephen J. Lee estimates that, by the end of World War II in 1945, the Russian population was about 90 million fewer than it could have been otherwise.

Former Soviet states in Central Asia such as Kazakhstan and Kyrgyzstan have very large minority Slavic populations with most being Russians. Kazakhstan has the largest Slavic minority population.

Languages

Proto-Slavic, the supposed ancestor language of all Slavic languages, is a descendant of common Proto-Indo-European, via a Balto-Slavic stage in which it developed numerous lexical and morphophonological isoglosses with the Baltic languages. In the framework of the Kurgan hypothesis, "the Indo-Europeans who remained after the migrations [from the steppe] became speakers of Balto-Slavic". Proto-Slavic is defined as the last stage of the language preceding the geographical split of the historical Slavic languages. That language was uniform, and on the basis of borrowings from foreign languages and Slavic borrowings into other languages, it cannot be said to have any recognizable dialects, which suggests that there was, at one time, a relatively-small Proto-Slavic homeland.

Slavic linguistic unity was to some extent visible as late as Old Church Slavonic (or Old Bulgarian) manuscripts which, though based on local Slavic speech of Thessaloniki, could still serve the purpose of the first common Slavic literary language.

Standardised Slavic languages that have official status in at least one country are: Belarusian, Bosnian, Bulgarian, Croatian, Czech, Macedonian, Montenegrin, Polish, Russian, Serbian, Slovak, Slovene, and Ukrainian. Russian is the most spoken Slavic language, and is the most spoken native language in Europe.

The alphabets used for Slavic languages are usually connected to the dominant religion among the respective ethnic groups. Orthodox Christians use the Cyrillic alphabet while Catholics use the Latin alphabet; the Bosniaks, who are Muslim, also use the Latin alphabet and Cyrillic alphabet in Serbia. Additionally, some Eastern Catholics and Western Catholics use the Cyrillic alphabet. Serbian and Montenegrin use both the Cyrillic and Latin alphabets. There is also a Latin script to write in Belarusian, called Łacinka and in Ukrainian, called Latynka.

Ethno-cultural subdivisions
West Slavs originate from early Slavic tribes which settled in Central Europe after the East Germanic tribes had left this area during the migration period. They are noted as having mixed with Germanics, Hungarians, Celts (particularly the Boii), Old Prussians, and the Pannonian Avars. The West Slavs came under the influence of the Western Roman Empire (Latin) and of the Catholic Church.

East Slavs have origins in early Slavic tribes who mixed and contacted with Finns, Balts and with the remnants of the people of the Goths. Their early Slavic component, Antes, mixed or absorbed Iranians, and later received influence from the Khazars and Vikings. The East Slavs trace their national origins to the tribal unions of Kievan Rus' and Rus' Khaganate, beginning in the 10th century. They came particularly under the influence of the Byzantine Empire and of the Eastern Orthodox Church.

South Slavs from most of the region have origins in early Slavic tribes who mixed with the local Proto-Balkanic tribes (Illyrian, Dacian, Thracian, Paeonian, Hellenic tribes), and Celtic tribes (particularly the Scordisci), as well as with Romans (and the Romanized remnants of the former groups), and also with remnants of temporarily settled invading East Germanic, Asiatic or Caucasian tribes such as Gepids, Huns, Avars, Goths and Bulgars. The original inhabitants of present-day Slovenia and continental Croatia have origins in early Slavic tribes who mixed with Romans and romanized Celtic and Illyrian people as well as with Avars and Germanic peoples (Lombards and East Goths). The South Slavs (except the Slovenes and Croats) came under the cultural sphere of the Eastern Roman Empire (Byzantine Empire), of the Ottoman Empire and of the Eastern Orthodox Church and Islam, while the Slovenes and the Croats were influenced by the Western Roman Empire (Latin) and thus by the Catholic Church in a similar fashion to that of the West Slavs.

Genetics
Consistent with the proximity of their languages, analyses of Y chromosomes, mDNA, and autosomal marker CCR5de132 shows the gene pool of Eastern and Western Slavs to be identical and demonstrating significant differences from neighboring Finno-Ugric, Turkic, and North Caucasian peoples. Such genetic homogeneity is somewhat unusual, given such a wide dispersal of Slavic populations, especially Russians. Together they form the basis of the "East European" gene cluster, which also includes non-Slavic Hungarians and Aromanians.

Only Northern Russians among East and West Slavs belong to a different, “Northern European” genetic cluster, along with Balts, Germanic and Baltic Finnic peoples (Northern Russian populations are very similar to Balts).

The 2006 Y-DNA study results "suggest that the Slavic expansion started from the territory of present-day Ukraine, thus supporting the hypothesis placing the earliest known homeland of Slavs in the basin of the middle Dnieper". According to genetic studies until 2020, the distribution, variance and frequency of the Y-DNA haplogroups R1a and I2 and their subclades R-M558, R-M458 and I-CTS10228 among South Slavs correlate with the spread of Slavic languages during the medieval Slavic expansion from Eastern Europe, most probably from the territory of present-day Ukraine and Southeastern Poland.

Religion

The pagan Slavic populations were Christianized between the 7th and 12th centuries. Orthodox Christianity is predominant among East and South Slavs, while Catholicism is predominant among West Slavs and some western South Slavs. The religious borders are largely comparable to the East–West Schism which began in the 11th century. Islam first arrived in the 7th century during the early Muslim conquests, and was gradually adopted by a number of Slavic ethnic groups through the centuries in the Balkans.

Among Slavic populations who profess a religion, the majority of contemporary Christian Slavs are Orthodox, followed by Catholic. The majority of Muslim Slavs follow the Hanafi school of the Sunni branch of Islam. Religious delineations by nationality can be very sharp; usually in the Slavic ethnic groups, the vast majority of religious people share the same religion.

Mainly Eastern Orthodoxy:
 Russians
 Ukrainians
 Serbs
 Bulgarians
 Belarusians
 Macedonians
 Montenegrins

Mainly Catholicism:
 Poles (incl. Silesians, Kashubians, Gorals)
 Croats 
 Slovaks
 Slovenes
 Sorbs
 Rusyns
 Banat Bulgarians

Mainly Islam:
 Bosniaks
 Pomaks
 Gorani
 Torbeši
 Ethnic Muslims

Relations with non-Slavic people

Throughout their history, Slavs came into contact with non-Slavic groups. In the postulated homeland region (present-day Ukraine), they had contacts with the Iranian Sarmatians and the Germanic Goths. After their subsequent spread, the Slavs began assimilating non-Slavic peoples. For example, in the Northern Black Sea region, the Slavs assimilated the remnants of the Goths. In the Balkans, there were Paleo-Balkan peoples, such as Romanized and Hellenized (Jireček Line) Illyrians, Thracians and Dacians, as well as Greeks and Celtic Scordisci and Serdi. Because Slavs were so numerous, most indigenous populations of the Balkans were Slavicized. Thracians and Illyrians mixed as ethnic groups in this period. A notable exception is Greece, where Slavs were Hellenized because Greeks were more numerous, especially with more Greeks returning to Greece in the 9th century and the influence of the church and administration, however, Slavicized regions within Macedonia, Thrace and Moesia Inferior also had a larger portion of locals compared to migrating Slavs. Other notable exceptions are the territory of present-day Romania and Hungary, where Slavs settled en route to present-day Greece, North Macedonia, Bulgaria and East Thrace but assimilated, and the modern Albanian nation which claims descent from Illyrians and other Balkan tribes.

The status of the Bulgars as a ruling class and their control of the land nominally left their legacy in the Bulgarian country and people, but Bulgars were gradually also Slavicized into the present-day South Slavic ethnic group known as Bulgarians. The Romance speakers within the fortified Dalmatian cities retained their culture and language for a long time. Dalmatian Romance was spoken until the high Middle Ages, but, they too were eventually assimilated into the body of Slavs.

In the Western Balkans, South Slavs and Germanic Gepids intermarried with invaders, eventually producing a Slavicized population. In Central Europe, the West Slavs intermixed with Germanic, Hungarian, and Celtic peoples, while in Eastern Europe the East Slavs had encountered Finnic and Scandinavian peoples. Scandinavians (Varangians) and Finnic peoples were involved in the early formation of the Rus' state but were completely Slavicized after a century. Some Finnic tribes in the north were also absorbed into the expanding Rus population. In the 11th and 12th centuries, constant incursions by nomadic Turkic tribes, such as the Kipchak and the Pecheneg, caused a massive migration of East Slavic populations to the safer, heavily forested regions of the north. In the Middle Ages, groups of Saxon ore miners settled in medieval Bosnia, Serbia and Bulgaria, where they were Slavicized.

Saqaliba refers to the Slavic mercenaries and slaves in the medieval Arab world in North Africa, Sicily and Al-Andalus. Saqaliba served as caliph's guards. In the 12th century, Slavic piracy in the Baltics increased. The Wendish Crusade was started against the Polabian Slavs in 1147, as a part of the Northern Crusades. The pagan chief of the Slavic Obodrite tribes, Niklot, began his open resistance when Lothar III, Holy Roman Emperor, invaded Slavic lands. In August 1160 Niklot was killed, and German colonization (Ostsiedlung) of the Elbe-Oder region began. In Hanoverian Wendland, Mecklenburg-Vorpommern and Lusatia, invaders started germanization. Early forms of germanization were described by German monks: Helmold in the manuscript Chronicon Slavorum and Adam of Bremen in Gesta Hammaburgensis ecclesiae pontificum. The Polabian language survived until the beginning of the 19th century in what is now the German state of Lower Saxony. In Eastern Germany, around 20% of Germans have historic Slavic paternal ancestry, as revealed in Y-DNA testing. Similarly, in Germany, around 20% of the foreign surnames are of Slavic origin.

Cossacks, although Slavic and practicing Orthodox Christianity, came from a mix of ethnic backgrounds, including Tatars and other peoples. Initially, the Cossacks were a mini-subethnos, but now they are less than 5%, and most of them live in the south of Russia. The Gorals of southern Poland and northern Slovakia are partially descended from Romance-speaking Vlachs, who migrated into the region from the 14th to 17th centuries and were absorbed into the local population. The population of Moravian Wallachia also descended from the Vlachs. Conversely, some Slavs were assimilated into other populations. Although the majority continued towards Southeast Europe, attracted by the riches of the area that became the state of Bulgaria, a few remained in the Carpathian Basin in Central Europe and were assimilated into the Magyar people. Numerous rivers and places in Romania have a name with Slavic origins.

Population

Winkler Prins (2002) estimated the number of Slavs worldwide to be around  260 million at the time.

Historiography

See also

 Ethnic groups in Europe
 Gord (archaeology)
 Lech, Čech, and Rus
 List of modern ethnic groups
 List of Slavic tribes
 Outline of Slavic history and culture
 Panethnicity
 Pan-Slavic colors
 Slavic names
 Asia Minor Slavs
 Bulgarisation
 Russification
 Serbianisation
 Polonization

Notes

References

Citations

Sources 
 Primary sources
 
 

 Secondary sources

 
 
 
 
 
 
 Curta Florin, The early Slavs in Bohemia and Moravia: a response to my critics
 
 
 
 
 Lacey, Robert. 2003. Great Tales from English History. Little, Brown and Company. New York. 2004. .
 Lewis, Bernard. Race and Slavery in the Middle East. Oxford Univ. Press.
 
 Nystazopoulou-Pelekidou, Maria. 1992. The "Macedonian Question": A Historical Review. © Association Internationale d'Etudes du Sud-Est Europeen (AIESEE, International Association of Southeast European Studies), Comité Grec. Corfu: Ionian University. (English translation of a 1988 work written in Greek.)
 
 
 Rębała, Krzysztof, et al.. 2007. Y-STR variation among Slavs: evidence for the Slavic homeland in the middle Dnieper basin. Journal of Human Genetics, May 2007, 52(5): 408–414.

Further reading

External links

Mitochondrial DNA Phylogeny in Eastern and Western Slavs, B. Malyarchuk, T. Grzybowski, M. Derenko, M. Perkova, T. Vanecek, J. Lazur, P. Gomolcaknd I. Tsybovsky, Oxford Journals

 
Indo-European peoples
Modern Indo-European peoples